Nothoploca is a genus of moths belonging to the subfamily Thyatirinae.

Species 
Nothoploca endoi Yoshimoto, 1983
Nothoploca nigripunctata (Warren, 1915)
Nothoploca nigripunctata fansipana Laszlo, G.Ronkay, L.Ronkay & Witt, 2007
Nothoploca nigripunctata zolotarenkoi Dubatolov, 1987

References 

 , 1915, Tinea 11 (14): 125.
 , 2007, Esperiana Buchreihe zur Entomologie Band 13: 1-683 

Thyatirinae
Drepanidae genera